| tries = {{#expr:
 + 2 + 6 + 3 + 6 + 3 + 6
 + 1 + 1 + 5 + 4 + 5 + 5
 + 5 + 5 + 5 + 4 + 6 + 6
 + 7 + 7 + 5 + 1 + 2 + 3
 + 2 + 3 + 3 + 2 + 2 + 4
 + 1 + 6 + 2 + 8 + 1 + 2
 + 2 + 1 + 8 + 3 + 2 + 5
 + 5 + 1 + 6 + 3 + 2 + 4
 + 3 + 1 + 3 + 4 + 2 + 4
+ 2 + 1 + 1 + 1 + 7 + 0
+ 4 + 3 + 5 + 9 + 5 + 4
+ 2 + 2 + 1 + 4 + 6 + 2
+ 3 + 6 + 3 + 5 + 4 + 2
+ 1 + 3 + 3 + 4 + 5 + 2
+ 7 + 5 + 4 + 3 + 4 + 3
+ 3 + 2 + 4 + 3 + 6 + 6
+ 2 + 3 +10 + 7 + 6 + 8
+ 1 + 3 + 3 + 7 + 3 + 1
+ 6 + 3 + 6 + 9 + 6 + 6
+ 4 + 7 +10 + 8 + 8 + 4
+ 2 + 9 +11 + 9 + 9 + 6
+ 2 + 8 + 5 + 4 +13 + 7
+ 4 + 5 + 3
}}
| top point scorer = George Ford (Bath)(250 points)
| top try scorer = Vereniki Goneva (Leicester)(12 tries)
| website    = www.premiershiprugby.com
| prevseason = 2012–13
| nextseason = 2014–15
}}

The 2013–14 Aviva Premiership was the 27th season of the top flight English domestic rugby union competition and the fourth one to be sponsored by Aviva. The reigning champions entering the season were Leicester Tigers, who had claimed their tenth title after defeating Northampton Saints in the 2013 final. Newcastle Falcons had been promoted as champions from the 2012–13 RFU Championship at the first attempt.

This season was also the first season to be broadcast exclusively by BT Sport.

Summary
Northampton Saints won their first title after defeating Saracens in the final at Twickenham after having finished second in the regular season table. Worcester Warriors were relegated after being unable to win their penultimate game of the season. It was the second time that Worcester have been relegated from the top flight since the leagues began and the first time since the 2009–10 Premiership Rugby season.

As usual, round 1 included the London Double Header at Twickenham, the tenth instance since its inception in 2004.

Teams
Twelve teams compete in the league – the top eleven teams from the previous season and Newcastle Falcons who were promoted from the 2012–13 RFU Championship after a top flight absence of one year. They replaced London Welsh who were relegated after one year in the top flight.

Stadiums and locations

Pre-season
The 2013 edition of the Premiership Rugby Sevens Series began on 1 August 2013 at Kingsholm, continued on 2 August at Franklin's Gardens and 3 August at Allianz Park. The finals was on 9 August 2013 at The Recreation Ground. This was the first opportunity of the season for any of the teams competing in the Premiership to win a trophy.  Gloucester 7s won the Series Final, beating Leicester Tigers 7s 24 – 17 and with it qualification to the inaugural World Club 7s at Twickenham.

Table

Regular season
Premiership Rugby announced the fixture list on 4 July 2013. As with previous seasons, Round 1 included the London Double Header at Twickenham. Fixtures as per Premiership Rugby Match Centre.

Round 1

Round 2

Round 3

Round 4

Round 5

Round 6

Round 7

Round 8

Round 9

Round 10

Round 11

Round 12

Round 13

Round 14

Round 15

Round 16

Round 17

Round 18

 This result meant that Saracens would finish in the top four and therefore a place in the playoffs.

Round 19

Round 20

 This result meant that Northampton would finish in the top four and therefore a place in the playoffs.

Round 21

Round 22
All games in Round 22 kicked off at 15:15 on 10 May 2014, so as to not give any team a potential advantage with regards to knowing how to achieve a play-off berth, European Rugby Champions Cup place, or safety from relegation.

Play-offs
As in previous seasons, the top four teams in the Premiership table, following the conclusion of the regular season, contest the play-off semi-finals in a 1st vs 4th and 2nd vs 3rd format, with the higher ranking team having home advantage. The two winners of the semi-finals then meet in the Premiership Final at Twickenham on 31 May 2014.

Bracket

Semi-finals

Final
The final was contested at Twickenham between the winners of the two semi-finals.  For the first time, the final went to extra time as the teams finished the regulation 80 minutes at 14 all.

Leading scorers
Note: Flags indicate national union as has been defined under WR eligibility rules. Players may hold more than one non-WR nationality.

Most points
Source:

Most tries
Source:

Season attendances

By club

Retirements
 7 October 2013 Andrew Higgins (Newcastle Falcons) retired, aged 32, due to a knee injury. 
 9 October 2013 Olly Morgan (Gloucester) retired, aged 27, due to knee injuries.
 18 December 2013 Brett Deacon (Leicester Tigers) retired, aged 31, due to contracting lupus.

Notes

References

External links
Official Site

 
2013-14
 
England